McCreery is an unincorporated community in Raleigh County, West Virginia, United States.

The community was named after James T. McCreery, the original owner of the town site.

References 

Unincorporated communities in West Virginia
Unincorporated communities in Raleigh County, West Virginia